Each president of the city of Kraków (known as the Mayor) fulfills his duties with the help of the City Council, city managers and the city inspectors. Their joint responsibilities include drafting and implementing resolutions, enacting city bylaws, managing city budget as well as its administration, and preparing against floods and natural disasters. The Kraków Council resides at the Wielopolski Palace at All Saints 3-4 Square in a historic building erected originally in 1560; purchased by the Municipality in 1864.

The city budget of Kraków
The budget of the city of Kraków, which is presented by the Mayor of Kraków on 15 November each year, in 2006 had a projected revenue of 2,150 million złoty. 
The sources of revenue were as follows: 14% from the municipal taxation on real estate properties as well as on the use of amenities, 3% in taxes collected by Collections Office, 7% from sale and lease of city-owned properties, 30% in transfers from the national budget based in federal income tax, 34% in state subsidies, 3% in union fees, 1% from tax on liquor sales permits, and 8% from vehicle registrations, passport fees and others.

Projected expenditures, to the total amount of 2,349 million złoty, included: 79% in city maintenance costs, and 21% in city development costs. The maintenance costs were divided as follows: 39% toward education and childcare, 9% for the city infrastructure and lighting, 31% toward social services, 4% for culture and recreational facilities, 3% for mortgage repayments, 1% in transfers to poorer districts and 13% for other expenses including city administration.

City of Kraków development costs were divided as follows: 41% toward road building, transport and communication, 25% – city's infrastructure and environment, 2% for social housing, 8% for modernization of cultural facilities including museums, 15% for sports facilities, and 9% for hospitals, daycare centres and schools.

Budget of Krakow for the year 2006: revenue and expenditures

President of Kraków 

President of Kraków is elected every five years in an election by city voters through a secret ballot. The election of City Council and the local head of government, which takes place at the same time, is based on legislation introduced on 20 June 2002. The current President of Kraków, re-elected for his second, third, fourth and fifth term in 2018 is Prof. Jacek Majchrowski, lawyer, historian, professor of Jagiellonian University and doctor honoris causa of Bordeaux University.

See also
 Kraków City Council

References

Economy of Kraków
Government budgets
Kraków